Joe or Joseph Paterson may refer to:

 Joe Paterson (ice hockey), Canadian ice-hockey player
 Joe Paterson (baseball), American baseball player
 Joe Paterson (cricketer), Scottish cricketer

See also
 Joseph Patterson (disambiguation)
 Paterson Joseph, British actor